Ankara's first electoral district is one of three divisions of Ankara province for the purpose of elections to Grand National Assembly of Turkey. It elects sixteen members of parliament (deputies) to represent the district for a four-year term by the D'Hondt method, a party-list proportional representation system.

Division
The first electoral district contains the following Ankara administrative districts (ilçe):

Akyurt
Bala
Çankaya
Elmadağ
Etimesgut
Evren
Gölbaşı
Haymana
Mamak
Polatlı
Sincan
Şereflikoçhisar

Members
Population reviews of each electoral district are conducted before each general election, which can lead to certain districts being granted a smaller or greater number of parliamentary seats.  Ankara's first district elected 15 MPs in 2002 and 2007.  In 2011, this number increased to 16.

General elections

June 2015

2011

References 

Electoral districts of Turkey